Koiak 7 - Coptic Calendar - Koiak 9

The eighth day of the Coptic month of Koiak, the fourth month of the Coptic year. On a common year, this day corresponds to December 4, of the Julian Calendar, and December 17, of the Gregorian Calendar. This day falls in the Coptic season of Peret, the season of emergence. This day falls in the Nativity Fast.

Commemorations

Saints 

 The martyrdom of Saint Esi and his Sister, Saint Thecla 
 The martyrdom of Saints Barbara and Juliana 
 The departure of Saint Samuel the Confessor
 The departure of Pope Heraclas, the thirteenth Patriarch of the See of Saint Mark 
 The departure of Saint Yustus the Monk, of Saint Anthony's Monastery

References 

Days of the Coptic calendar